Killed in action (KIA) is a casualty classification generally used by militaries to describe the deaths of their own personnel at the hands of enemy or hostile forces at the moment of action. The United States Department of Defense, for example, says that those declared KIA did not need to have fired their weapons, but only to have been killed due to hostile attack. KIAs include those killed by friendly fire in the midst of combat, but not from incidents such as accidental vehicle crashes, murder or other non-hostile events or terrorism. KIA can be applied both to front-line combat troops and to naval, air and support troops.

Furthermore, KIA denotes a person to have been killed in action on the battlefield whereas died of wounds (DOW) relates to someone who survived to reach a medical treatment facility. The North Atlantic Treaty Organization (NATO) also uses DWRIA, rather than DOW, for "died of wounds received in action".

PKIA means presumed killed in action. This term is used when personnel are lost in battle, initially listed missing in action (MIA), but after not being found, are later presumed to have not survived. This is typical of naval battles or engagements on other hostile environments where recovering bodies is difficult. A very large number of soldiers killed in action went unidentified in World War I, like the son of British poet Rudyard Kipling, prompting the formation of the Commonwealth War Graves Commission.

NATO definition 
NATO defines killed in action or a battle casualty as a combatant who is killed outright or who dies as a result of wounds or other injuries before reaching a medical treatment facility or help from fellow comrades.

See also 

 Assassination
 Missing in action (MIA)
 Prisoner of war (POW)
 Wounded in action (WIA)

References

External links 
 

Military terminology
War
War casualties